The P&LE McKeesport Bridge is a truss bridge across the Youghiogheny River connecting the east and west banks of the Pittsburgh industrial suburb of McKeesport, Pennsylvania. In 1968, the Pittsburgh & Lake Erie Railroad undertook a major construction project in conjunction with the B&O Railroad to clear tracks from downtown McKeesport. These tracks caused traffic congestion and posed a safety hazard. As a result, both this bridge and the nearby P&LE Liberty Boro Bridge were created to direct rail traffic to the west bank of the river, which featured a less confusing street grid.

Before the construction of this structure, an elaborate 1881 bridge stood on the site, which connected two P&LE lines. With both the P&LE and B&O having ceased operations, the structure currently serves the Pittsburgh-to-Cumberland, Maryland CSX Keystone Subdivision.

References
PGH Bridges

Truss bridges in the United States
Bridges in Allegheny County, Pennsylvania
Bridges completed in 1968
Railroad bridges in Pennsylvania
Bridges over the Youghiogheny River